Vladimir Golubović (born 24 February 1986) is a Serbian-born Montenegrin professional basketball player who last played for Real Betis Energía Plus of the Liga ACB.

Professional career
Golubović started his career with Vojvodina from his hometown Novi Sad, where he was born to Montenegrin parents. He played with them from 2003 to 2008. In August 2008, he signed a two-year contract with the Slovenian club Union Olimpija. In February 2010, he parted ways with Olimpija, and signed a one-month contract with the Spanish club Caja Laboral. The next month, he signed a one more one-month contract with Laboral, and later was re-signed for the rest of the season. At the end of the season, the club did not re-signed him so he became a free agent.

In July 2010, he signed a one-year contract with the Turkish club Banvit. In September 2011, he signed with the Ukrainian club Azovmash. Two months later, Azovmash released him. In December 2011, he returned to his former team Caja Laboral, signing a two-month contract. In February 2012, he was re-signed until the end of the 2012 Spanish Cup, and on 20 February he was officially waived by the club.

In March 2013, he signed with the Turkish club Antalya Büyükşehir Belediyesi. The next month, he moved to Dubai and signed with Al Ahli, but ten days later he returned to Europe and signed with the Spanish club CAI Zaragoza for the 2013 ACB Playoffs.

In August 2013, he signed a one-year contract with the Turkish club TED Ankara Kolejliler. In April 2014, he was named to the All-EuroCup First Team. In June 2014, he signed a one-year deal with the Spanish club Unicaja Málaga.

On 6 September 2015, he signed a contract until the end of the EuroLeague regular season, with French club Strasbourg IG. On 29 December 2015, he signed with the Italian club Pallacanestro Reggiana for the rest of the season.

On 2 July 2016, Golubović signed with Best Balıkesir for the 2016–17 season.

On 21 September 2017, Golubovic signed with Spanish club Real Betis Energía Plus.

National team
As a member of the Serbia and Montenegro national basketball team, Golubović won the bronze medal at the 2005 Summer Universiade in Izmir and 2005 FIBA Europe Under-20 Championship in Russia.

He was also a member of the Montenegro national basketball team.

References

External links
 Vladimir Golubović  at acb.com
 Vladimir Golubović at eurobasket.com
 Vladimir Golubović at euroleague.net
 Vladimir Golubović at fiba.com
 Vladimir Golubović at tblstat.net

1986 births
Living people
ABA League players
Antalya Büyükşehir Belediyesi players
Baloncesto Málaga players
Bandırma B.İ.K. players
Basket Zaragoza players
Basketball players from Novi Sad
BC Azovmash players
BC Spartak Primorye players
BC Zepter Vienna players
Best Balıkesir B.K. players
Real Betis Baloncesto players
Centers (basketball)
KK Olimpija players
KK Vojvodina Srbijagas players
Liga ACB players
Montenegrin expatriate basketball people in France
Montenegrin expatriate basketball people in Italy
Montenegrin expatriate basketball people in Russia
Montenegrin expatriate basketball people in Serbia
Montenegrin expatriate basketball people in Spain
Montenegrin expatriate basketball people in Turkey
Montenegrin men's basketball players
Ethnic Montenegrin people
Saski Baskonia players
Serbian expatriate basketball people in Austria
Serbian expatriate basketball people in France
Serbian expatriate basketball people in Italy
Serbian expatriate basketball people in Russia
Serbian expatriate basketball people in Slovenia
Serbian expatriate basketball people in Spain
Serbian expatriate basketball people in Turkey
Serbian expatriate basketball people in the United Arab Emirates
Serbian expatriate basketball people in Ukraine
Serbian expatriate basketball people in Qatar
Serbian men's basketball players
Serbian people of Montenegrin descent
SIG Basket players
TED Ankara Kolejliler players
Universiade medalists in basketball
Universiade bronze medalists for Serbia and Montenegro
Medalists at the 2005 Summer Universiade